The 2014–15 Division 1 Féminine season was the 41st since its establishment. Lyon were the defending champions. The season began on 30 August 2014 and ended on 9 May 2015. The winter break began on 22 December 2014 and ended on 9 January 2015.

Teams 

There were three promoted teams from the Division 2 Féminine, the second level of women's football in France, replacing the three teams that were relegated from the Division 1 Féminine following the 2013–14 season. A total of 12 teams currently compete in the league with three clubs suffering relegation to the second division, Division 2 Féminine.

Teams promoted to 2014–15 Division 1 Féminine
 Albi
 Issy
 Metz

Teams relegated to 2014–15 Division 2 Féminine
 Hénin-Beaumont
 Muret
 Yzeure

Stadia and locations

League table 

Note: A win in D1 Féminine is worth 4 points, with 2 points for a draw and 1 for a defeat.

Results

Season statistics

Top scorers
Updated to games played on 9 May 2015

Top assists
Updated to games played on 9 May 2015

Hat-tricks
Updated to games played on 9 May 2015

4 Player scored 4 goals

References

External links 
 Standings and Statistics

Fra
1
2014